Laxapana Power Station may refer to:

 Old Laxapana Power Station, a hydroelectric power station fed by the Norton Dam in Sri Lanka
 New Laxapana Power Station, a hydroelectric power station fed by the Canyon Dam in Sri Lanka
 Polpitiya Power Station, a hydroelectric power station fed by the Laxapana Dam in Sri Lanka